ChangeGroup is a UK-based retail foreign exchange and bureau de change company, headquartered in London. The company has 120 branches in airports, seaports and city centres globally, as well as an online currency exchange service. In 2014 it rolled out dynamic currency conversion (DCC) enabled and foreign currency dispensing ATMs.

History
The company was founded in 1992 by Mohammed Zackariya-Marikar. His son, Sacha Zackariya later took over as CEO.

The venture capital group 3i Plc was a shareholder in the company for a time. 

In 2002, the company acquired the Estonian Monex network from Hansa Bank.

The Change Group International plc was started by Zackariya-Marikar with Bette Zackariya and Sacha Zackariya in 1992 from a single bureau in London Regent Street to create an international group across city branches, airports and offices in Europe, USA and Australia, employing 80 nationalities. Originally funded by private equity from 3i plc, their stake was bought out in 2005. Today The Change Group serves approximately 5 million customers annually. The Group concluded over 18 M&A transactions over the last 25 years and won many awards including the Queen's Award in 2006 for International Trade. The profit for the year, after taxation, amounted to £1,988,000 (2016: restated £1,347,000).

Following the Covid Pandemic, The Change Group was acquired by the Spanish cash services company Prosegur Cash SA in 2022.

Reviews
A report by the Sunday Times found that ChangeGroup offered the best online exchange rates on euros when it conducted research in July 2011.

References

Private equity portfolio companies
Foreign exchange companies
Companies based in the London Borough of Camden
Financial services companies established in 1992
Financial services companies of the United Kingdom
British companies established in 1992
Foreign exchange market
Multinational companies